Elwood Township is a township in Vermilion County, Illinois, USA.  As of the 2010 census, its population was 1,647 and it contained 718 housing units.

History
Elwood Township was one of the eight townships created in 1851. It was named after the Elwood Meeting House, which had been named for Thomas Ellwood. John Haworth, founder of the Vermilion County Quaker community, likely suggested the name.

Geography

Cities and towns
 Ridge Farm

Unincorporated towns
 Olivet
 Vermilion Grove

Adjacent townships
 Georgetown Township (north)
 Love Township (east)
 Prairie Township, Edgar County (southeast)
 Ross Township, Edgar County (southwest)
 Carroll Township (west)

Cemeteries
The township contains six cemeteries: Crown Hill, Dalbey, Pilot Grove, Sharon, Shock and Vermilion.

Major highways
  U.S. Route 150
  Illinois State Route 1

Demographics

School districts
 Georgetown-Ridge Farm Consolidated Unit School District 4
 Jamaica Community Unit School District 12

Political districts
 Illinois' 15th congressional district
 State House District 104
 State Senate District 52

References
 U.S. Board on Geographic Names (GNIS)
 United States Census Bureau 2007 TIGER/Line Shapefiles

External links
 US-Counties.com
 City-Data.com
 Illinois State Archives

Townships in Vermilion County, Illinois
Townships in Illinois